The 1878 Perthshire by-election was fought on 2 February 1878.  The byelection was fought due to the death of the incumbent Conservative MP, Sir William Stirling-Maxwell.  It was won by the Conservative candidate Henry Home-Drummond-Moray.

References

Perthshire by-election
1870s elections in Scotland
Politics of Perth and Kinross
Perthshire by-election
By-elections to the Parliament of the United Kingdom in Scottish constituencies